"It's Coming" is a song by South Korean singer Rain featuring Tablo, taken from his fourth Korean-language studio album Rain's World. It was released on October 14, 2006, in conjunction with the album, and was written and produced by Park Jin-young with additional writing credits by Tablo.

Background and composition 
"I'm Coming" went through numerous revisions over the span of two-years before its release. The song begins: "Ajigdo naleul umjig-ineun him-eun" (아직도 나를 움직이는 힘은, The force that still moves me) then continues till the refrain beginning "Rain is coming down" in English. The title phrase "I'm coming" does not actually appear in the lyrics.

Music video
The music video begins with Rain in a room with a light representing the sun rising. Then he is shown coming down a helicopter with wings and looking around. The atmosphere suggests a war has just happened so he has a very pained face. The scene changes and he is walking to a clearing in the wreckage without wings and soldiers are coming out of the rubble. The rest is a dance interlude.

Accolades

References

External links
 Rain - Official English website 

JYP Entertainment singles
2006 singles
Rain (entertainer) songs
Korean-language songs
Songs written by Park Jin-young